The Brussels Christmas tree is a Christmas tree erected annually in the Grand-Place, Brussels, Belgium. It has traditionally been a real tree either from the Ardennes forest, from the city of Helsinki or from different countries as diplomatic gift, except in 2012 when it was replaced with an abstract sculpture.

Traditional trees
Traditionally, the Grand-Place in the centre of Brussels hosts a real Christmas tree each year, taken from the Ardennes forest. The Grand-Place itself dates from the 17th century and has played host to a Christmas market each year since 2000.

2012 tree
It was designed to work with an overall theme of light installations in the Grand-Place, and allowed visitors to climb to the top of the "tree". It was constructed out of steel-framed boxes, wood and screening materials. It cost €40,000 ($52,000) to construct, which was described as about a third of the price of a real tree.
The Belgian press reacted negatively to the installation of the tree, with some suggesting that it was erected to avoid offending Muslims. Brussels city councillor  concurred with this sentiment, and also pointed out that it marked a change of name for the annual Christmas market to "Winter Pleasures". Fellow councillor Philippe Close responded to that criticism by saying, "What we want is just to modernise the pleasure of winter, of this Christmas market and all the image of Brussels. The Christmas tree is not a religious symbol and actually lots of Muslims have a Christmas tree at home." By 1 December, an online petition against the installation had received 11,000 signatures. By 11 December, this had increased to 25,000.

Due to concerns over vandalism during New Year's celebrations in the Grand-Place, it was announced in early December that the tree would be taken down on 28 December, instead of early January, as was the case with the real trees in the past.

See also
"Tree", a controversial abstract Christmas tree in Paris

References

Individual Christmas trees
Buildings and structures in Brussels
Tourist attractions in Brussels
Christmas in Belgium
City of Brussels
Individual trees in Belgium